Nehemiah Persoff (August 2, 1919 – April 5, 2022) was an American character actor and painter. He appeared in more than 200 television series, films, and theatre productions and also performed as a voice artist in a career spanning 55 years, beginning after his service in the United States Army during World War II.

Persoff got his first part as an extra in The Naked City (1948). He is best known for roles as Leo in The Harder They Fall (1956), as Little Bonaparte in Some Like It Hot (1959), as Rebbe Mendel in Yentl (1983), and as the voice of Papa Mousekewitz in the animated film An American Tail (1986) and its sequels. He also made appearances on episodes of The Twilight Zone, Gilligan's Island, Hawaii Five-O, Adam-12 and Law & Order.

Biography

Early life and training
Persoff was born in Jerusalem, Mandatory Palestine, on August 2, 1919, to Puah (née Holman, 1887–1963) and Shmuel Persoff (1885–1961). His father, who was a silversmith, jeweler, and art teacher, decided that there were better prospects in the United States and initially emigrated on his own. It was another six years before he was financially secure and was able in 1929 to bring over his wife, three sons, Boaz, Avraham, and Nehemiah, and two daughters, Tamar and Geula (Julia). At first the family lived in an apartment in the Williamsburg area of Brooklyn, before eventually moving to the Bronx. His parents later returned to Israel.

Persoff attended the Hebrew Technical Institute, graduating in 1937. With the electrician training that he had received at the Institute, after his military service he gained a job as a subway signal maintenance worker.

Army service
Persoff was drafted by the U.S. Army in early 1942 and served during World War II until 1945. He was assigned to an acting company to entertain troops around the world.

Acting career
Persoff began to pursue his acting career in New York theatre. In 1947, he was accepted into the Actors Studio, and was one of the 26 members of the beginners' class taught by Elia Kazan, along with Martin Balsam, Julie Harris, Kim Hunter, Cloris Leachman and James Whitmore. He began his acting career in 1948.

His first role was an uncredited bit part in the film noir The Naked City (1948).

Among his early film roles was as the taxi driver during Brando's "I coulda been a contender" scene in On the Waterfront (1954), Leo the accountant in The Harder They Fall (1956) with Humphrey Bogart and Rod Steiger, and the gangster boss Little Bonaparte (a parody of Rico/Little Caesar) in Billy Wilder's film Some Like It Hot (1959), and he appeared again with Steiger in Al Capone (also 1959). He also appeared in supporting roles in films such as The Comancheros (1961) and The Greatest Story Ever Told (1965).

Persoff alongside Dean Stockwell and Andrew Bloch appeared as Darius the Great's wicked Babylonian administrators in the 1978 Greatest Heroes of the Bible episode Daniel in the Lions' Den.

In the film Yentl (1983), Persoff portrayed the father of Barbra Streisand's character. He appeared in the comedy film Twins (1988) and in the American Tail animated-film series as Papa Mousekewitz. His last movie was 4 Faces (1999), the last film to be directed by Ted Post.

His acting career included many appearances in television series, including six episodes of The Untouchables, three episodes of which he appeared as Jake "Greasy Thumb" Guzik (regarded by many as his signature role), and Gilligan's Island as the title character in the episode "The Little Dictator" (the favorite episode of the show's creator Sherwood Schwartz).  Persoff appeared on the Star Trek: The Next Generation episode "The Most Toys" and was the oldest living male actor to appear in a Star Trek production at the time of his death.

Retirement and memoir
Persoff retired from acting in 2003 and pursued painting, specializing in watercolors.

His memoir, The Many Faces of Nehemiah, was published by The Autumn Road Company in July 2021.

Personal life and death
In 1951, Persoff married Thia Persov, who had served as a nurse with the Palmach, the elite fighting force of the Haganah during the 1948 Arab-Israeli War. She died of cancer in 2021. The couple had four children, Jeffrey, Dan, Perry, and Dahlia. Before his death, he lived in Cambria, California.

Persoff died on April 5, 2022, at the age of 102 of heart failure at a rehabilitation facility in San Luis Obispo, California.

Selected filmography

Film and television

References

External links

 
 
 Nehemiah Persoff Paintings
 

1919 births
2022 deaths
American people of Palestinian-Jewish descent
American male film actors
American male television actors
American male voice actors
American male painters
United States Army personnel of World War II
20th-century American painters
21st-century American painters
21st-century American male artists
Painters from New York City
Military personnel from New York City
Mandatory Palestine emigrants to the United States
Electricians
Jews in Mandatory Palestine
Jewish American male actors
Jewish painters
Male actors from Jerusalem
United States Army soldiers
Western (genre) television actors
American centenarians
Men centenarians
21st-century American Jews
Deaths from congestive heart failure
20th-century American male artists